Arthur Ashe was the defending champion but lost in the quarterfinals to Harold Solomon.

Björn Borg won in the final 1–6, 6–1, 7–5, 6–1 against Guillermo Vilas.

Seeds
A champion seed is indicated in bold text while text in italics indicates the round in which that seed was eliminated.

  Arthur Ashe (quarterfinals)
  Guillermo Vilas (final)
  Björn Borg (champion)
  Raúl Ramirez (quarterfinals)
  Dick Stockton (semifinals)
  Eddie Dibbs (quarterfinals)
  Harold Solomon (quarterfinals)
  Robert Lutz (semifinals)

Draw

References
1976 World Championship Tennis Finals Draw (Archived 2009-05-05)

Singles